The Beau's Duel is a 1702 comedy play by the English writer Susanna Centlivre.

The original Lincoln's Inn Fields cast included John Corey as Colonel Manly, Barton Booth as Bellmein, George Powell as Toper, John Bowman as Mode, George Pack as Ogle, William Fieldhouse as Careful, Mary Porter as Emilia and Elinor Leigh as Mrs Plotwell.

References

Bibliography
 Burling, William J. A Checklist of New Plays and Entertainments on the London Stage, 1700-1737. Fairleigh Dickinson Univ Press, 1992.

1702 plays
Comedy plays
West End plays
Plays by Susanna Centlivre